Kandrawan is a village in Unchahar block of Raebareli district, Uttar Pradesh, India. It is located on the road from Salon to Khaga, near the banks of the Ganges. Nearby there is a ferry crossing the Ganges over to Naubasta in Fatehpur district. As of 2011, Kandrawan has a population of 10,283 people, in 1,901 households. It is 3 km from Unchahar.

This village is known as birthplace of freedom fighter Dal Bahadur Singh. He was a close associate of Indira Gandhi, Feroze Gandhi and Jawahar Lal Nehru. He was a Member of the Legislative Assembly. This village also has a temple which known as Chahil Baba. It is believed that it was built in the 10th century. Other than it there is other temples which name is Shiv Mandir and Khanauveer Baba.

History
At the turn of the 20th century, Kandrawan was described as a large but otherwise unimportant village in the pargana of Salon. It was divided into 5 mahals, of which 3 were held by Kanhpurias and 2 were held by Bais. As of 1901, its population was 3,581 people, a majority of whom were Ahirs.

The 1961 census recorded Kandrawan as comprising 39 hamlets, with a total population of 4,068 people (2,077 male and 1,991 female), in 892 households and 875 physical houses. The area of the village was given as 3,227 acres and it had a post office at that point.

The 1981 census recorded Kandrawan as having a population of 5,318 people, in 1,306 households, and having an area of 1,305.92 hectares. The main staple foods were listed as wheat and barley.

References

Villages in Raebareli district